The Coors 420 was a NASCAR Winston Cup Series stock car race held at Nashville International Raceway. It was held annually from 1959 to 1984.

Past winners

*1974: Race shortened due to energy crisis.

Multiple winners (drivers)

Multiple winners (manufacturers)

References

External links
 

 
1959 establishments in Tennessee
1984 disestablishments in Tennessee
Former NASCAR races
Recurring sporting events disestablished in 1984
Recurring sporting events established in 1959